Yuri may refer to:

People and fictional characters

Given name
Yuri (Slavic name), the Slavic masculine form of the given name George, including a list of people with the given name Yuri, Yury, etc.
Yuri and Yūri, feminine Japanese given names, including a list of people and fictional characters
Yu-ri (Korean name), Korean unisex given name, including a list of people and fictional characters

Singers
Yuri (Japanese singer), vocalist of the band Move
Yuri (Korean singer), member of Girl Friends
Yuri (Mexican singer)
Kwon Yu-ri, member of Girls' Generation

Footballers
Yuri (footballer, born 1982), full name Yuri de Souza Fonseca, Brazilian football forward
Yuri (footballer, born 1984), full name Yuri Adriano Santos, Brazilian footballer
Yuri (footballer, born 1986), full name Yuri Vera Cruz Erbas, Brazilian footballer
Yuri (footballer, born 1989), full name Yuri Naves Roberto, Brazilian football defensive midfielder
Yuri (footballer, born 1990), full name Yuri Savaroni Batista da Silva, Brazilian footballer
Yuri (footballer, born 1991), full name Yuri de Jesus Messias, Brazilian footballer
Yuri (footballer, born September 1992), full name Yuri Soares Liberator de Oliveira, Brazilian footballer
Yuri (footballer, born October 1992), full name Yuri Tracante Sousa, Brazilian footballer
Yuri (footballer, born April 1994), full name Yuri Lima Lara, Brazilian football midfielder
Yuri (footballer, born June 1994), full name Marcos Yuri Gonçalves da Silva de Souza, Brazilian forward
Yuri (footballer, born August 1994), full name Yuri Oliveira Lima, Brazilian football defensive midfielder
Yuri (footballer, born January 1996), full name Yuri Antonio Costa da Silva, Brazilian footballer
Yuri (footballer, born April 1996), full name Yuri Nascimento de Araujo, Brazilian footballer
Yuri (footballer, born 1997), full name Yuri Gonçalves de Souza, Brazilian footballer
Yuri (footballer, born 1998), full name Yuri Jonathan Vitor Coelho, Brazilian footballer
Yuri (footballer, born 2001), full name Yuri de Oliveira, Brazilian football midfielder

Fictional characters
 Yuri, the antagonist of the real-time strategy game Command & Conquer: Red Alert 2 and its expansion pack Yuri's Revenge
 Yuri, an ex-Spetsnaz operative and playable character from the first-person shooter Call of Duty: Modern Warfare 3
Yuri, a character from the psychological horror video game Doki Doki Literature Club!
Yuri, a character in the manga series Girls' Last Tour
Yuri Leclerc, a character from the tactical role-playing video game Fire Emblem: Three Houses
Yuri Lowell, a character from the video game Tales of Vesperia
 Yuri Solotov, a character from the video game Lost Planet: Extreme Condition
 Yuri, a character from the video game Counter Strike: Condition Zero
 Yuri Sakazaki, a character from the Art of Fighting video game series

Languages
Yuri language (Amazon), an Amerindian language of Colombia and Brazil
Karkar language, a language isolate spoken in Papua New Guinea also known as "Yuri"

Places
Yuri (island), one of the Kuril islands claimed by Japan
Yuri, Akita, a former town in Akita Prefecture, Japan; now part of Yurihonjō
Yuri District, Akita, a former district

Other uses
Yuri (genre) (百合 "lily"), Japanese lesbian/sapphic fiction
Yuri (satellite), the first dedicated Japanese broadcasting satellite and start of the BS-series
Yuri I, a human-powered helicopter developed in Japan
Typhoon Yuri (disambiguation)

See also
Yūri-kinsai, Japanese ceramic technique
Yūrei, figures in Japanese folklore, analogous to Western legends of ghosts
Yuriko (disambiguation)
Juri (disambiguation)